Lake Park is a city in Lowndes County, Georgia, United States. The population was 733 at the 2010 census, up from 549 at the 2000 census.

History
Lake Park was laid out in 1889 along the route of the newly completed Georgia Southern and Florida Railway. It was originally named Lawrence after its founder Lawrence A. Wisenbaker. The name Lawrenceville was rejected due to there already being a town of that same name in Georgia. It was renamed Lake Park in April 1890 for the many lakes surrounding the original town site. The Georgia General Assembly incorporated Lake Park in December 1890.

Geography

Lake Park is located in southeastern Lowndes County at  (30.684704, -83.187639). It is bordered to the northwest by the unincorporated community of Twin Lakes.

U.S. Route 41 passes through the center of town as Marion Avenue. It leads northwest  to Valdosta, the county seat, and southeast  to Jennings, Florida. Georgia State Route 376 leads east  to Statenville and west  to Clyattville. Interstate 75 passes west and south of Lake Park, with access from Exits 2 (Belville Road) and 5 (State Route 376). I-75 leads north past Valdosta  to Tifton and southeast  to Lake City, Florida.

There are several natural lakes west and north of the city, including two (Ocean Pond and Long Pond) within the city limits.

Demographics

As of the census of 2000, there were 549 people, 224 households, and 140 families residing in the city. The racial makeup of the city was 80.15% White, 15.66% African American, 1.82% Native American, 0.36% Asian, 0.36% from other races, and 1.64% from two or more races. Hispanic or Latino of any race were 4.19% of the population.

There were 224 households, out of which 28.1% had children under the age of 18 living with them, 45.5% were married couples living together, 14.3% had a female householder with no husband present, and 37.5% were non-families. 35.7% of all households were made up of individuals, and 18.8% had someone living alone who was 65 years of age or older.  The average household size was 2.31 and the average family size was 2.96.

In the city, the population was spread out, with 22.6% under the age of 18, 8.7% from 18 to 24, 25.1% from 25 to 44, 22.2% from 45 to 64, and 21.3% who were 65 years of age or older.  The median age was 41 years. For every 100 females, there were 84.2 males.  For every 100 females age 18 and over, there were 81.6 males.

The median income for a household in the city was $28,359, and the median income for a family was $31,806. Males had a median income of $30,521 versus $17,083 for females. The per capita income for the city was $17,715.  About 12.8% of families and 19.8% of the population were below the poverty line.

Education
The Lowndes County School District operates Lake Park Elementary School. High school students attend Lowndes High School.

South Georgia Regional Library operates the Edith Garlow Johnston Lakes Library in Lake Park. Country Johnson, a property developer in the area, donated the land for the library. It was named after his wife, Edith Garlow Johnson, and opened on March 4, 1990.

References

External links

Lake Park official website
Dasher and Lake Park, Georgia
Lake Park Chamber of Commerce

Cities in Georgia (U.S. state)
Cities in Lowndes County, Georgia
Cities in the Valdosta metropolitan area